Châu Hưng  is a commune-level town (thị trấn) in Vĩnh Lợi District, Bạc Liêu Province, in south-western Vietnam.

References

Populated places in Bạc Liêu province
Communes of Bạc Liêu province
District capitals in Vietnam
Townships in Vietnam